Mohamed Eid Naser Al-Bishi (born 3 May 1987) is a Saudi Arabian former footballer defender.

He was a member of the national team, and was called up to the 2006 FIFA World Cup after Mohammed Al-Anbar was injured in a training session.

References

1987 births
Living people
Saudi Arabian footballers
Saudi Arabia international footballers
2006 FIFA World Cup players
Al-Ahli Saudi FC players
Al Nassr FC players
Al-Faisaly FC players
Baish FC players
Saudi Professional League players
Sportspeople from Jeddah
Association football defenders